Untitled is a painting by the Russian-American Abstract expressionist artist Mark Rothko. It was painted in 1952. In common with Rothko's other works from this period, it consists of large expanses of colour delineated by uneven, hazy shades.

In 2014, Untitled was bought for $66 million by an anonymous buyer.

See also
 List of most expensive paintings

Sources
Baal-Teshuva, Jacob. Rothko. Berlin: Taschen, 2003.   

1952 paintings
Paintings by Mark Rothko